Figure skating was featured as part of the 2011 Asian Winter Games at the Saryarka Velodrome in Astana, Kazakhstan. Events were held on between the third and fifth of February 2011. Skaters competed in four disciplines: men's singles, ladies' singles, pairs, and ice dance.

Schedule

Medalists

Medal table

Participating nations
A total of 49 athletes from 12 nations competed in figure skating at the 2011 Asian Winter Games:

References

Results

External links
Official website
Results

 
2011
Asian Winter Games
2011 Asian Winter Games events
International figure skating competitions hosted by Kazakhstan